Leonel Pontes is a São Toméan politician.

He travelled to Geneva, Switzerland for the International Red Cross Commission of the United Nations. He was named as the country's Minister of Health in 2012 for the XIV Constitutional Government led by Gabriel Costa up to his resignation on 2 January 2014 a few days after the reshufflement of the government. .

References

Year of birth missing (living people)
Living people
Government ministers of São Tomé and Príncipe
21st-century São Tomé and Príncipe politicians